Bolaji Amusan  (born 15 October 1966), known by his comic persona Mr Latin, is a Nigerian comic actor, filmmaker, director and producer. Since 2018 he has been president of the Theatre Arts and Movie Practitioners Association of Nigeria.

Early life and career
Amusan was born at Gbongan, the headquarters of Aiyedaade Local Government Area in Osun State, southwestern Nigeria.

He began acting in 1988, became a comedian in 1991, and acquired the name Mr Latin after he spoke French while acting in the 1992 film 50-50 produced by Akin Ogungbe, who mistook it for Latin.

He has produced over 40 movies, mostly comedies, and is the CEO of Mr. Latin TV and the Mr. Latin Foundation.

Amusan joined the Association of Nigerian Theatre Arts Practitioners, now the Theatre Arts and Movie Practitioners Association of Nigeria, in 1989; after serving in local posts, he was governor for Ogun State in 2006–2010, later became director for organization and business, and in 2018 was elected its president.

Personal life
He married Ronke Amusan in 1999; they have two children. He is a cousin to Temidayo Enitan.

Filmography
50-50 (1992)
Ebun Igbeyawo (1996)
Faworaja (1999)
Nnkan Olomoba (2000)
Talo n gbemu (2001)
Eegun Mogaji
Obajobalo
Òfin mósè (2006).
Ile Itura (2007)
Baba Insurance (2009),
Ise onise (2009)
Baba Gomina
Aweni Baku
Emi Airi

See also
 List of Nigerian film producers
List of Yoruba people

References

Living people
1966 births
Nigerian male film actors
Yoruba male actors
Nigerian film directors
Nigerian film producers
Male actors in Yoruba cinema
Male actors from Osun State
20th-century Nigerian male actors
21st-century Nigerian male actors
Nigerian male television actors
Nigerian comedians